Giovanni Lombardi may refer to:
 Giovanni Lombardi (cyclist), Italian road racing cyclist
 Giovanni Lombardi (engineer), Swiss engineer
 Giovanni Domenico Lombardi, Italian painter